Nicole Jolicoeur (1947) is a Canadian artist from Quebec, best known for her work in photography and video. In the late 1980s, much of her work was inspired by research into Jean-Martin Charcot's theories on feminine "hysteria."

Life
Jolicoeur was born in 1947 in Beauceville, Quebec. She received an MFA from Rutgers University.

Collections
Jolicoeur's work is included in the collections of:
 the Musée national des beaux-arts du Québec,
 the Canada Council Art Bank and
 the National Gallery of Canada.
Musée-Château d'Annecy

Exhibitions 

 La Verite Folle (April 8 - May 7, 1989), Presentation House Gallery, North Vancouver, British Columbia
 Image d'une ville. Corps de l'image (July 1 - September 30, 1997), Palais de l'Isle, Annecy, France; (March 13 - April 18, 1998), Galerie de l'UQAM, Montréal, Québec
 Nicole Jolicoeur (September 17 - October 15, 2009), Gwen Frostic School of Art, Western Michigan University, Kalamazoo, Michigan
 Archives Vagabondes (October 9 - November 8, 2014), Occurrence, Montréal, Québec

Works 

 Charcot: deux concepts de nature (1988)
 Stigmata Diaboli (1992)
 Aura Hysterica (1992)

References

External links

"Nicole Jolicoeur" CV up to the year 2000. Retrieved 10 March 2019.

1947 births
Living people
Canadian women artists
École des Beaux-Arts
French Quebecers
Université Laval alumni
Rutgers University alumni
Artists from Quebec